Ellen Tracy is a clothing manufacturer; it was founded by Herbert Gallen in 1949,  selling to the international market. It 

The company has three divisions: 

 The Linda Allard for Ellen Tracy's signature collection of career wear.
 The Ellen Tracy Dresses.
 Company by Ellen Tracy.

Revlon has also produced an Ellen Tracy perfume.

History
As a result of wartime rations during World War II fabrics became difficult to obtain. However, Herbert Gallen was able to acquire some fabric from a friend. He produced several blouses which he took to major department stores on Manhattan's 34th Street. He sold all of the sample blouses and started a clothing line using his wife's name. Betty Barr, for the label. He opened a showroom on Third Avenue with financial backing from Mike Brewer, Gallen formed a new company in 1949 which he called Ellen Tracy. In 1962, he hired recent college graduate Linda Allard as his design assistant and within two years, she was named Director of Design. The company was acquired in 2002 by Liz Claiborne, Inc. and became a wholly owned subsidiary of that company.

Notable dates
In 1979, Ellen Tracy became involved in designer sportswear rather than just junior sportswear.
In 1983, they added a petite division.
In 1984, Linda Allard’s name was added to the Ellen Tracy label.
In 1985 the company added a dress division.
In 1983, their ad campaign featured model Carol Alt and in 1987 it featured a young Cindy Crawford.
In 1991, Ellen Tracy launched the Company Ellen Tracy line to appeal to younger wearers and also offered casual weekend clothing.
In the spring of 1993, they added a plus-size division.
In September 2002, Herbert Gallen sold the company to Liz Claiborne, Inc.
In 2010, Macy’s became the exclusive sportswear retailer for Ellen Tracy. The brand launched internationally in this year as well.

References

External links
 http://www.ellentracy.com/

1949 establishments in the United States
Clothing companies of the United States
Companies that filed for Chapter 11 bankruptcy in 2021